A general is a high-ranking military officer.

General or Generals may also refer to:

Companies and organizations
 General Airconditioners, a Japanese air-conditioning company
 General Electric, an American multinational conglomerate company founded in 1892
 General Motors, an American automotive manufacturer
 General snus, a popular brand of Swedish snuff
 General Tire, a tire manufacturer
 London General, a bus operating company in London owned by Go-Ahead Group

Sports teams
 Washington Generals, an American exhibition basketball team, known for opposing the Harlem Globetrotters
 New Jersey Generals, a franchise in the defunct United States Football League
 Greensboro Generals, a minor league ice hockey team from Greensboro, North Carolina
 Oshawa Generals, a junior ice hockey team in the Ontario Hockey League
 Washington and Lee Generals, the athletics teams of Washington and Lee University, Lexington, Virginia
 Generals, mascot and athletics teams of Washington-Lee High School in Arlington, Virginia
 The Generals, the athletic teams of SUNY Sullivan, a community college in Loch Sheldrake, New York

Games
 General (video game), a turn-based strategic game developed by NewGame Software
Command & Conquer: Generals, a real-time strategy computer game by Electronic Arts
 General, a character in the Mega Man X4 video game

Other uses
 General, an album by Circle (Finnish band)
 General (DC Comics), or The General, a comic book character
 General (G.I. Joe), the G.I. Joe team's mobile strike headquarters
 Generals (album), an album by The Mynabirds
 General (film), a 1959 East German film
 General (newspaper), a Malayalam-language daily newspaper in Kerala, India
 General (train), a passenger train operated by the Pennsylvania Railroad
 General Records, an American record label
 General hospital, or simply “general”, a common type of hospital
 The General of the Salvation Army, the international leader of a Christian denomination
 General, the middle of three standard grade tiers of the Scottish Qualifications Authority's National Qualifications

See also
 The General (disambiguation)